The acronym ISEE can refer to:
ISEE (company), Integration Software Electronics Engineering
Independent School Entrance Examination
International Sun/Earth Explorer, one of a series of spacecraft, ISEE-1, ISEE-2 and ISEE-3, the last later called the International Cometary Explorer
International Society for Ecological Economics
International Society for Environmental Epidemiology
International Society for Environmental Ethics
International Society for Explosive Engineers
Institut national de la statistique et des études économiques,  the national statistics bureau of France
Institute of Statistics and Economic Studies, the statistics bureau of New Caledonia